Icons is a documentary TV show that aired on G4 from May 1, 2002, to March 4, 2007. It originally focused on significant people, companies, products, history, and milestones in the world of video games.

On May 10, 2006, it was announced that Icons was relaunching on June 3 with an episode focusing on J. J. Abrams. The relaunch was an attempt to feature a broader scope on things and people that "men 18–34 care about, admire and emulate." Recent episodes about George A. Romero, Frank Miller and the history of the King Kong franchise had aired prior to the announcement. The final season focused on pop culture subjects such as Marc Ecko, The Onion, and Family Guy.  The classic video game themed episodes continued to air on the network sporadically until 2009, under the new name of Game Makers, unrelated to the G4 series of the same name.

Episodes

Season 1

Season 2

Season 3

Season 4

Season 5

Specially released episodes
At least six of these episodes were put onto versions of the games they were about.
 Episode 112, "Sid Meier,"was put in the game of the year edition of Civilization IV.
 Episode 116, "John Madden NFL Football," was featured as part of the Madden 2005: Collector's Edition for PlayStation 2.
 Episode 117, "Splinter Cell," was featured on the Splinter Cell: Chaos Theory collectors disc for the PlayStation 2.
 Episode 219, "Mega Man," was featured on the Nintendo GameCube and Xbox versions of Mega Man Anniversary Collection (Though some of the content featured in the original episode that was unrelated to Mega Man or Capcom was removed).
 Episode 310, "The DOOM Franchise," was featured on the Doom 3 Collector's Edition for Xbox
Episode 311, "Dead or Alive", was included as an unlockable movie in Dead or Alive Ultimate.

References

External links
 

2002 American television series debuts
2007 American television series endings
G4 (American TV network) original programming
Documentary television series about video games